Astraeus telleriae is a species of false earthstar in the family Diplocystaceae. Described as new to science in 2013, it is found in the Mediterranean region, from southern Spain to Greece. The specific epithet honours Spanish mycologist Maria Teresa Telleria.

References

External links

Boletales
Fungi described in 2013
Fungi of Europe